The Charm The Fury was a Dutch metal band from Amsterdam, formed in 2010.

In 2013 The Charm The Fury released their first album, A Shade of my Former Self, throughout Listenable Records, after independently releasing the EP The Social Meltdown, back in 2012. In 2014, the band played at FortaRock Festival in Nijmegen and in 2015 at Graspop Metal Meeting in Belgium. In 2017, the band released their second album, The Sick, Dumb & Happy, though Nuclear Blast.

On 20 November 2018 the band announced they were breaking up due to line-up changes and financial reasons.

Band members 
Final lineup
 Caroline Westendorp – vocals (2010–2018)
 Lucas Arnoldussen – bass guitar (2010–2018)
 Mathijs Tieken – drums (2010–2018)
 Martijn Slegtenhorst – rhythm guitar (2016–2018)
 Koen Stokman – lead guitar (2017–2018)

Previous members
 Mathijs Parent – rhythm guitar (2010–2016)
 Rolf Perdok – lead guitar (2011–2017)

Session members (live shows)
 Siebe Sol – bass guitar (2015–2018)

 Timeline

Discography

Studio albums 
 A Shade of My Former Self (2013)
 The Sick, Dumb & Happy (2017)

EPs 
 The Social Meltdown (2012)

Sources 
 Volkskrant over TCTF (Dutch article)
 Interview op metalfan.nl (Dutch article)

References 

Dutch heavy metal musical groups
Musical groups established in 2010
Musical groups disestablished in 2018
2010 establishments in the Netherlands
Arising Empire artists